Croixanvec is a former commune in the Morbihan department of Brittany in north-western France. On 1 January 2022, it was merged into the new commune Saint-Gérand-Croixanvec.

Demographics
Inhabitants of Croixanvec are called in French Croixanvequois.

See also
Communes of the Morbihan department

References

External links

Former communes of Morbihan
States and territories disestablished in 2022